Close Relations is a 1933 American Pre-Code comedy film starring Fatty Arbuckle. This film features Shemp Howard of The Three Stooges in a non-speaking role.

Cast
 Roscoe 'Fatty' Arbuckle as Wilbur Wart
 Harry Shannon as Harry Wart
 Charles Judels as Uncle Ezra Wart
 Hugh O'Connell as Doctor Carver
 Mildred Van Dorn as The Nurse
 Shemp Howard as One of the Moles

See also
 List of American films of 1933
 Fatty Arbuckle filmography

External links

1933 films
1933 comedy films
1933 short films
American black-and-white films
Films directed by Ray McCarey
Vitaphone short films
American comedy short films
Films produced by Samuel Sax
Warner Bros. short films
1930s American films